Jules Maigret, or simply Maigret, is a fictional French police detective, a commissaire ("commissioner") of the Paris Brigade Criminelle (Direction Régionale de la Police Judiciaire de Paris:36, Quai des Orfèvres), created by writer Georges Simenon. The character's full name is Jules Amédée François Maigret.

Between 1931 and 1972, 75 novels and 28 short stories about Maigret were published, starting with Pietr-le-Letton ("The Strange Case of Peter the Lett") and concluding with Maigret et Monsieur Charles ("Maigret and Monsieur Charles"). With the creation of Maigret, Simenon renewed the detective novel-genre. The novels and stories have been translated into more than 50 languages.

The Maigret stories have also received numerous film, television and radio adaptations. Penguin Books published new translations of 75 books in the series over as many months; the project was begun in November 2013 by translators David Bellos, Anthea Bell, and Ros Schwartz.

Character

Creation

The character of Maigret was invented by Simenon while drinking in a cafe and imagining a Parisian policeman: "a large powerfully built gentleman...a pipe, a bowler hat, a thick overcoat."

Biographers Thomas Narcejac and Fenton Bresler both see Simenon himself in his creation.

Description
Maigret is described as a large, broad-shouldered man – he is gruff but patient and fair.

Recurring characters in the series include Maigret's wife Louise (usually referred to simply as Madame Maigret) and in particular "The Faithful Four", a group consisting of his four loyal police colleagues (Sgt./Inspector Lucas, Janvier, Lapointe, and Torrence).
Other prominent characters include police surgeon Dr. Paul and the Examining Magistrate, Judge Coméliau, who alternates between being a help and a hindrance to Maigret.

Maigret doesn't like his first name being used and prefers to be simply called "Maigret". Even Maigret's wife largely restricts herself to calling him "Maigret", only calling him by his first name a handful of times.

In most novels, Maigret is aged around 45 to 55 years. There are contradictive clues to his year of birth. In Monsieur Gallet, décédé, which takes place in 1930, Maigret is described as 45, indicating 1885 as his year of birth. In another novel La premier enquete de Maigret, where the investigation takes place in 1913, the author states that Maigret is 26, which establish his year of birth as 1887. In the 1932 novel  L'affaire Saint-Fiacre, Maigret is 42, which would mean he was born in 1890, assuming that Maigret is contemporary to the year the novel was written.

Maigret began working as a police man in Paris in his twenties. At the age of 30 he entered the Homicide Squad and later, nearing his forties, became chief inspector of the squad. It is mentioned that Maigret retired when he would be in his mid-fifties, which gives him over 30 years of experience in the police.

He was from the village of Saint-Fiacre in the Allier Department, where his father Evariste Maigret was the bailiff for the local landowner; see Simenon's novel Maigret's Failure (Un échec de Maigret), about a school bully and contemporary, "Fatty" Ferdinand Fumal from the same village.

Characteristics
Maigret wears a thick overcoat, a bowler hat and frequently smokes a tobacco pipe. He is described to be tall with a heavy weight, and to have broad shoulders, big hands, a thick face, thick hair, thick eyebrows and bright eyes of a "greenish gray" colour. He has a heavy beard, and shaves every morning.

In his investigations, Maigret's method is to put himself in another persons place to search for the reason, and understand why, the crime was committed, rather than just finding out whodunit. He is described as a character with an extraordinary humanity.

List of novels
List of Maigret novels with date of French-language publication as well as the Penguin reissue dates and titles.

List of short stories
List of Maigret short stories by date of first publication in French.

In other media

Theatre 

A production called Maigret and the Lady by Philip Mackie toured in England and Scotland in 1965, before playing at the Strand Theatre in London in October 1965. Madame Maigret was played by Charmian Eyre, and Maigret was Rupert Davies.

Film
The cinematic potential of Maigret was realized quickly: the first screen Maigret was Pierre Renoir in 1932's Night at the Crossroads, directed by his brother Jean Renoir; the same year brought The Yellow Dog with Abel Tarride, and Harry Baur played him in 1933's A Man's Neck, directed by Julien Duvivier.

In 1950, Charles Laughton played the first English-language Maigret in The Man on the Eiffel Tower, adapted from the 1931 novel A Battle of Nerves. The film co-starred Franchot Tone, Burgess Meredith, and Wilfrid Hyde-White.

In France, Albert Préjean portrayed Maigret in three films; Picpus, Cecile Is Dead, and Majestic Hotel Cellars. A decade later, Jean Gabin played the part in three other films; Maigret Sets a Trap, Maigret et l'Affaire Saint-Fiacre, and Maigret voit rouge. Heinz Rühmann played the lead in a 1966 European international co-production Enter Inspector Maigret.

Gerard Depardieu starred as Maigret in a 2022 French film, entitled Maigret, adapted from Maigret and the Dead Girl.

Television
There have been numerous incarnations of Maigret on the small screen all around the world. He has been portrayed by French, British, Irish, Austrian, German, Italian, Dutch, Japanese, and Russian actors. A French version, Les Enquêtes du Commissaire Maigret, starred Jean Richard in 88 episodes between 1967 and 1990; however, Simenon himself is said to have disliked Richard's Maigret because he would not take his hat off when entering a room. Later, Bruno Cremer played the character in 54 adaptations between 1991 and 2005.

Luis van Rooten played Maigret in an episode of Suspense entitled The Old Lady of Bayeux, whilst Louis Arbessier appeared in a televised film of Liberty Bar.
The Italian actor Gino Cervi played the character on Italian television from 1964 up to 1972 in Le inchieste del commissario Maigret; Simenon himself considered Cervi's interpretation of the character to be "very good." This series resulted in 14 novels and 2 short stories being adapted.

In the Soviet Union, Russian theatre actor  portrayed Maigret in several TV films in the 1970s. In Soviet cinema, apart from Boris Tenin, Maigret was portrayed by cinema actors Vladimir Samoilov and Armen Dzhigarkhanyan.

In Japan, Kinya Aikawa played Megure, a Japanese-born equivalent to the French Maigret, reinvented in a modern Japanese setting, in Tōkyō. Megure Keishi, a 25-episode TV series aired from 14 April to 29 May 1978 on Asahi TV. Megure's wife was played by Sato Tomomi, who earned the praises of Simenon himself: "The best 'Madame Maigret' in my opinion, even including the French ones, was the 'Madame Maigret' on Japanese television. She was exactly right".

The title role in the 1960s British Maigret TV series was played by the actor Rupert Davies, who made his debut on 31 October 1960. Davies took over the part after Basil Sydney, who appeared as Maigret in the original transmitted pilot, proved unavailable owing to ill-health. Davies went on to star in 52 adaptations for BBC TV in that decade. His portrayal won two of the highest accolades: his versions were dubbed into French and played across the Channel; and Simenon himself said of Davies "At last, I have found the perfect Maigret!" The theme tune to the TV series, "Midnight in Montmartre", was composed by Ron Grainer. Kees Brusse and Jan Teulings also portrayed the character in separate Dutch adaptations produced around the same time.

Granada Television produced an adaptation of Maigret for ITV in 1992 and 1993 in which Michael Gambon starred as Maigret; there were 12 adaptations in the two series. An earlier version, Maigret (1988) on ITV cast Richard Harris in the lead role.

In 2004, Sergio Castellitto played Maigret in two Italian TV movies: La trappola ("The Trap") and L'ombra cinese ("The Chinese Shadow").

Rowan Atkinson plays Maigret in Maigret for television films made by ITV from 2016. The first two episodes were adapted from Maigret Sets a Trap and Maigret's Dead Man. Two further episodes were broadcast in 2017, adapted from Maigret at the Crossroads and Maigret in Montmartre.

In 2021, the Simenon estate signed a co-production and licensing deal with Playground Entertainment and Red Arrow Studios to produce a new English-language series, with the option extending to the entire Maigret canon.

Radio
Maurice Denham played Chief Inspector Maigret in a series of three-quarter-hour dramatizations of the novels on BBC Radio 4 beginning in 1976, with Michael Gough playing Georges Simenon. The format of each play would begin with Maigret and Simenon sitting together discussing some fact or event which would then lead into Maigret's recounting a particular case, with Simenon asking questions or commenting from time to time. After Denham's death, the series was continued in 2003 with Nicholas Le Prevost playing a gruffer, more earthy Maigret and Julian Barnes playing Simenon.

In 1990-1991, abridgments of some of the novels (including "Madame Maigret's Case," "Maigret and the Tavern by the Seine," and "Maigret in Montmartre") were serialized in daily one-minute installments on WNCN, a classical music station in New York City. They were read every night at midnight in a radio program called the "H.B.J. Midnight Murder Mystery Minute."

Comics
Jacques Blondeau adapted the novels into the comic series Maigret (1950–53), published in Samedi Soir and Paris Journal. Rumeu (drawings) and Camille Dulac (script) adapted the Maigret story L'Affaire Nahour into the comic strip Maigret in 1969.

References

Further reading
 Bingemer, Stephan. "Holidays with Inspector Maigret: Mixed Reality Adventures as Value Drivers in Future Tourism." in Science Fiction, Disruption and Tourism (2021).
 Chartrand, Tanya L., and John A. Bargh. "The chameleon effect: the perception–behaviour link and social interaction." ;;Journal of personality and social psychology 76.6 (1999): 893+ online.
 Wenger, Murielle, and Stephen Trussel. Maigret's World: A Reader's Companion to Simenon's Famous Detective'' (McFarland, 2017).

External links
 Simenon's Maigret (bibliography, statistics, online texts, links)
 Titles matching "Maigret" on IMDb

Book series introduced in 1931
Literary characters introduced in 1931
Fictional French police detectives
Fictional French police officers
Georges Simenon
Belgian novels adapted into films
Belgian novels adapted into plays
Novels adapted into radio programs
Belgian novels adapted into television shows
Novels adapted into comics
Male characters in literature